Rishiram Pradhan (born 1962) is a Nepalese judoka. He competed in the men's half-lightweight event at the 1988 Summer Olympics.

References

External links
 

1962 births
Living people
Nepalese male judoka
Olympic judoka of Nepal
Judoka at the 1988 Summer Olympics
Place of birth missing (living people)